FILE_ID.DIZ is a plain-text file containing a brief description of the content of archive to which it belongs.
Such files were originally used in archives distributed through bulletin board systems (BBSes) and is still used in the warez scene.  stands for "file identification".  stands for "description in zipfile".

Traditionally, a FILE_ID.DIZ should be "up to 10 lines of text, each line being no more than 45 characters long", according to v.1.9 of the specification. The concept of .DIZ files was to allow for a concise description of uploaded files to be automatically applied. Advertisements and "high-ASCII" artwork, common in .nfo files, were specifically prohibited.

History
Bulletin boards commonly accept uploaded files from their users. The BBS software would prompt the user to supply a description for the uploaded file, but these descriptions were often less than useful. BBS system operators spent many hours going over the upload descriptions correcting and editing the descriptions. The  inclusion in archives was designed to address this problem.

Clark Development and the Association of Shareware Professionals (ASP) supported the idea of this becoming a standard for file descriptions. Clark rewrote the PCBDescribe program and included it with their PCBoard BBS software. The ASP urged their members to use this description file format in their distributions. Michael Leavitt, an employee of Clark Development, released the file specification and his PCBDescribe program source code to the public domain and urged other BBS software companies to support the DIZ file.

SysOps could add a common third-party script written in PPL, called "DIZ/2-PCB" that would process, rewrite, verify, and format DIZ files from archives as they were uploaded to a BBS. The software would extract the archive, examine the contents, compile a report, import the DIZ description file and then format it according to your liking. During this time, it was usual practice to add additional lines to the description, such as ads exclaiming the source of the uploaded BBS.

Even since the decline of the dial-up bulletin board system, FILE_ID.DIZ files are still utilized by the warez scene in their releases of unlicensed software. They are commonly bundled as part of the complete packaging by self-described pirate groups, and indicate the number of disks, and other basic information. Along with the NFO file, it is essential to the release. Especially in terms of unlicensed software ("warez"), it was common for each file in a sequential compressed archive (an archive intentionally split into multiple parts at creation so the parts can then be individually downloaded by slower connections like dial-up. Example: .rar, .r00, .r01, .r02, etc.) to contain this file. This probably contributed to its extended popularity after the decline of the bulletin board system in the late 1990s and early 2000s until now, since even casual consumers of unlicensed software would have stumbled upon it due to its abundance.

Formal structure
While real-world use among BBSs varied, with the NPD world and even different BBS brands coming up with expanded versions, the official format is:

Plain, 7-bit ASCII text, each line no more than 45 characters wide.

 Program/file name: Ideally, all uppercase and followed by one space. Carriage returns are ignored in this file.
 Version number: In the format "v1.123", followed by a space.
 ASP number: Only if an actual ASP member, otherwise ignored.
 Description separator: A single short hyphen "-".
 Description: The description of the file. The first two lines should be the short summary, as older boards cut off the rest. Anything beyond that should be extended description, for up to eight lines, the official cut-off size. Additional text could be included beyond that but might not be included by the board. 

Many archives would stick strictly to the 45-character plain ASCII format for the first 8 lines, then contain an appended 80-character wide 8-bit ASCII or ANSI graphic page with better-formatted documentation after that.

See also
 .nfo — another standard for description files
 README
 Portable Application Description — a newer and more verbose alternative
 Standard (warez)
 SAUCE — an architecture or protocol created in 1994 for attaching metadata or comments to files. In use today as the de facto standard within the ANSI art community.
 DESC.SDI — a similar filename that had fairly wide support, including PCBoard. It tended to be limited to a single line (smaller than a FILE_ID.DIZ file).
 DESCRIPT.ION — a text file containing line by line file (and directory) descriptions (and optional meta data), originally introduced by JP Software in 1989

References

Further reading

External links
 FILE_ID.DIZ Specification v1.9 by Richard Holler.
 Public Service Announcement: file_id.diz

Bulletin board systems
Filenames
Third-party DOS files
Warez
Articles with underscores in the title